William Terry Nofsinger (July 13, 1938October 2, 2007) was a professional American football player who played quarterback for seven seasons for the Pittsburgh Steelers (1961–1964), the St. Louis Cardinals (1965–1966), and the Atlanta Falcons (1967).

External links

1938 births
2007 deaths
Players of American football from Salt Lake City
American football quarterbacks
Utah Utes football players
Pittsburgh Steelers players
St. Louis Cardinals (football) players
Atlanta Falcons players